Ndongo is a surname of African origin; specifically Cameroon and Equatorial Guinea,

List of people with the surname 

 Atanasio Ndongo Miyone, Equatoguinean musician, writer and  political figure
 Bertrand Ndongo (born 1990), Cameroonian activist in Spain
 Cyrille Ndongo-Keller (born 1974), Cameroonian football coach and former football player
 Donato Ndongo-Bidyogo (born 1950), Equatoguinean journalist and writer
 Franck Ndongo (born 1988), Cameroonian basketball player
 Jacques Fame Ndongo (born 1950), Cameroonian politician
 Martin Ndongo-Ebanga (born 1966), Cameroonian retired boxer
 Ndongo Serge Philippe (born 1994), Cameroonian footballer
 Vicenta Ndongo (born 1968), Spanish actress of Equatoguinean descent
 Vicente Ndongo (born 1992), Equatoguinean retired futsal player

See also 

 Kingdom of Ndongo

Surnames
Surnames of African origin